Route 11, or Highway 11 can refer to routes in the following countries:

International
 Asian Highway 11
 European route E11 
 European route E011

Argentina
 Buenos Aires Provincial Route 11

Australia

Queensland 
 Suttor Developmental Road (Queensland)

South Australia 
 South Australia

Tasmania 
 Marlborough Highway

Victoria 
 Mornington Peninsula Freeway
 Peninsula Link

Decommissioned 
 - Pacific Highway - Parts of the Pacific Highway at Pearces Corner was numbered A11 for NorthConnex but was removed shortly after

Austria
 Karawanken Autobahn

Belarus
 M11 highway (Belarus)

Bulgaria
 Републикански път I-11

Cambodia
National Highway 11 (Cambodia)

Canada 
 Alberta Highway 11
 British Columbia Highway 11
 Manitoba Highway 11
 New Brunswick Route 11
 Newfoundland and Labrador Route 11
 Ontario Highway 11
 Quebec Route 11 (former)
Prince Edward Island Route 11
 Saskatchewan Highway 11
 Yukon Highway 11

China
  G11 Expressway

Czech Republic
  D11 motorway (Czech Republic)
 I/11 Highway; Czech: Silnice I/11

Djibouti
  RN-11 (Djibouti)

Finland
 Finnish national road 11

India

Iran
 Road 11

Iraq
 Highway 11 (Iraq)

Ireland
 M11 motorway (Republic of Ireland)
 N11 road (Ireland)

Italy
 Autostrada A11
 RA 11

Japan
 Japan National Route 11
 Matsuyama Expressway
 Takamatsu Expressway
 Tokushima Expressway
 Hanshin Expressway Ikeda Route
 Route 11 (Nagoya Expressway)

Malaysia
 Bera Highway

New Zealand
 New Zealand State Highway 11

Paraguay
 National Route 11

Philippines
 N11 highway (Philippines)

Romania
 A11 - Motorway

Russia
 M11 highway (Russia)

South Africa
 N11 road (South Africa)

United Arab Emirates
 E11, a pan-emirate highway which is the longest numbered route in the UAE

United Kingdom
 M11 motorway
 British A11 (London-Norwich)

United States 
 Interstate 11
 U.S. Route 11
 U.S. Route 11W
 U.S. Route 11E
 New England Interstate Route 11 (former)
 Alabama State Route 11 (former)
 Alaska Route 11
 Arkansas Highway 11
 California State Route 11
 County Route A11 (California)
 County Route E11 (California)
 County Route G11 (California)
 County Route J11 (California)
 County Route S11 (California)
 Colorado State Highway 11
 Connecticut Route 11
 Delaware Route 11
 Florida State Road 11
 Georgia State Route 11
 Hawaii Route 11
 Idaho State Highway 11
 Illinois Route 11
 Indiana State Road 11
 Kentucky Route 11
 Maine State Route 11
 Massachusetts Route 11 (former)
 M-11 (Michigan highway)
 Minnesota State Highway 11
 County Road 11 (Dakota County, Minnesota)
 County Road 11 (Goodhue County, Minnesota)
 Missouri Route 11
 Nebraska Highway 11
 Nevada State Route 11 (former)
 New Hampshire Route 11
 New Hampshire Route 11D
 New Jersey Route 11 (former)
 New Jersey Route 11N (former)
 County Route 11 (Monmouth County, New Jersey)
 New Mexico State Road 11
New York State Route 11 (1924–1927) (former)
 County Route 11 (Albany County, New York)
 County Route 11 (Allegany County, New York)
 County Route 11 (Chenango County, New York)
 County Route 11 (Clinton County, New York)
 County Route 11 (Columbia County, New York)
 County Route 11 (Delaware County, New York)
 County Route 11 (Erie County, New York)
 County Route 11 (Essex County, New York)
 County Route 11 (Genesee County, New York)
 County Route 11 (Lewis County, New York)
 County Route 11 (Madison County, New York)
 County Route 11 (Monroe County, New York)
 County Route 11 (Niagara County, New York)
 County Route 11 (Oneida County, New York)
 County Route 11 (Ontario County, New York)
 County Route 11 (Orange County, New York)
 County Route 11 (Otsego County, New York)
 County Route 11 (Putnam County, New York)
 County Route 11 (Rockland County, New York)
 County Route 11 (Schoharie County, New York)
 County Route 11 (Schuyler County, New York)
 County Route 11 (Steuben County, New York)
 County Route 11 (Suffolk County, New York)
 County Route 11 (Sullivan County, New York)
 County Route 11 (Tioga County, New York)
 County Route 11 (Ulster County, New York)
 County Route 11 (Warren County, New York)
 County Route 11 (Wyoming County, New York)
 North Carolina Highway 11
 North Dakota Highway 11
 Ohio State Route 11
 Oklahoma State Highway 11
 Oregon Route 11
 Pennsylvania Route 11 (1920s) (former)
 Rhode Island Route 11
 South Carolina Highway 11
 South Dakota Highway 11
 Tennessee State Route 11
 Texas State Highway 11
 Texas State Highway Loop 11
 Farm to Market Road 11
 Texas Park Road 11
 Texas Recreational Road 11
 Utah State Route 11 (1910-1977) (former)
 Vermont Route 11
 Virginia State Route 11 (former)
 Washington State Route 11
 Washington State Highway 11 (former)
West Virginia Route 11 (1920s) (former)
 Wisconsin Highway 11
 Wyoming Highway 11

Territories
 Guam Highway 11

Uruguay 
  Route 11 José Batlle y Ordóñez / Ing. Eladio Dieste

See also 
 List of A11 roads
 List of highways numbered 11A
 List of highways numbered 11B
 List of highways numbered 11C